Geoff Tate is the eponymous solo debut from Queensrÿche vocalist Geoff Tate. It was released on DVD-Audio in 2003 and DualDisc in 2004. The DualDisc edition contains the album in 5.1 surround sound, an interview, as well as other bonus multimedia content. Tate followed up this work ten years later with 2012's Kings & Thieves.

In contrast of the heavy metal of Queensrÿche, the album explored a variety of other genres such as dance-pop, electronica, and adult contemporary. It received positive reviews from publications such as the AllMusic, where critic Gary Hill stated that "the disc is really quite solid and, given the chance, should be enjoyable" for listeners. The official Amazon.com review also stated, "The overall style is dramatic yet mellow, with hypnotic midtempo melodies and layers of lavish harmonies." The album became a commercial success, reaching the #22 slot on Billboard's Heatseekers chart.

Track listing
"Flood" – 5:24
"Forever" – 4:14
"Helpless" – 4:50
"Touch" – 4:07
"Every Move We Make" – 4:24
"This Moment" – 4:50
"In Other Words" – 4:52
"A Passenger" – 4:49
"Off the TV" – 4:00
"Grain of Faith" – 3:35
"Over Me" – 4:41

Personnel
Geoff Tate – lead and backing vocals
Jeff Carrell – electric guitar and backing vocals
Howard Chillcott – synthesizers, piano, organ, keyboards, and backing vocals
Chris Fox – electric bass and acoustic bass
Eyvind Kang – viola on "In Other Words"
Scott Moughton – electric guitar and classical guitar
Evan Schiller – acoustic drums and loops

Charts

See also

2002 in music
Kings & Thieves
Queensrÿche

References

External links
Album information on unofficial Geoff Tate homepage

2002 debut albums
Geoff Tate albums
Albums recorded at Bear Creek Studio